San Ferdinando may refer to:

 San Ferdinando, comune in the Province of Reggio Calabria in the Italian region Calabria
 San Ferdinando, southern district of Naples 
 San Ferdinando di Puglia, town and comune in the Province of Barletta-Andria-Trani in the Apulia region of southeast Italy

Churches 
 
 San Ferdinando, Livorno, a Baroque style, Roman Catholic church in Livorno, region of Tuscany, Italy
 San Ferdinando (church), Naples, church in central Naples, Italy